Mary Britten, M.D. is a British television series which originally aired on ITV in 1958. The show was made by the newly-established Southern Television, but was cancelled when the major ITV franchises lost interest in screening it.

Cast

Regular
 Brenda Bruce as  Mary Britten 
 Ronald Howard as Stephen Britten
 Bernard Archard as  Councillor Pyke 
 Gillian Lind as  Winnie Bishop
 Henri Vidon as 	 Dr. Bishop
 Olive Milbourne as Miss Wicker 
 James Raglan as  Walter Davis

Other
Actors who appeared in individual episodes of the series include Peter Vaughan, Richard O'Sullivan, Irene Handl, Elsie Wagstaff, Frazer Hines and Neil Hallett.

References

Bibliography
 Bernard Sendall. Independent Television in Britain: Origin and Foundation 1946–62, Volume 1. Springer,  1982.

External links
 

1958 British television series debuts
1958 British television series endings
1950s British drama television series
ITV television dramas
English-language television shows
Television shows produced by Southern Television